The Miss Washington competition is the pageant that selects the representative for the state of Washington in the Miss America pageant.

Regan Gallo of Pierce County was crowned Miss Washington 2022 on July 2, 2022, at Highline Performing Arts Center in Burien, Washington. She competed for the title of Miss America 2023 at the Mohegan Sun in Uncasville, Connecticut in December 2022.

History
Washington first sent delegates to Miss America in 1926 with Leona Fengler, Miss Seattle. She was sponsored by the Seattle Times newspaper, a practice common in the early days of Miss America pageants. She was pictured in the paper leaving in a biplane for her cross-country flight to Atlantic City, where she was voted "Prettiest Girl in an Evening Gown."  In 1987, Fendler was featured  again in the newly-revived Miss Seattle Pageant.

The Depression and war years caused sporadic participation by Washington contestants in the Miss America pageant, but the Miss Washington pageant was revived in 1948 and held in Ephrata, with a $1000 scholarship offered to the winner. In 1949 the pageant was a "financial flop" and the winner had to seek community donations to fund her appearance at Miss America. At the time the organization was so deeply in debt that the titleholder's tiara was nearly repossessed by the manufacturer.

From 1961 to 1997 the pageant was hosted by Vancouver, under a number of executive directors before moving to the Tri-Cities under the directorship of Chamber President, Dorothy Schoeppach. Under the direction of Schoeppach the local programs again grew from 9 to 22. Two years later the pageant moved to Tacoma under the directorship of Joan Dehn and Mike Shinkle.

The competition has been held in Renton since 2008 under the directorship of Charlie VanTramp and then Peggy Miller and Patti Belik, except for 2021, which was held at Little Creek Casino Resort in Shelton, WA, due to pandemic restrictions. The Miss Washington Scholarship Organization is a 501(c)3 organization, and sponsorship is tax deductible.

Gallery of past titleholders

Results summary 
Following is a visual summary of the results of Miss Washington titleholders at the national Miss America pageants/competitions. The year in parentheses indicates the year of the national competition during which a placement and/or award was garnered, not the year attached to the contestant's state title.

Placements 
 2nd runners-up: Anna Mae Schoonover (1939), Sharon Vaughn (1960), Sharon Rogers (1983), Elyse Umemoto (2008)
 3rd runners-up: Honey Castro (1986), Jacquie Brown (2011), Alicia Cooper (2017)
 4th runners-up: Laurie Nelson (1979)
 Top 10: Lauren Waddleton (1965), Susan Buckner (1972), Leslie Mays (1974), Kathleen Moore (1975), Doris Hayes (1981), Jennifer Wall (1990), SoYoung Kwon (1992), Kristen Eddings (2007), Mandy Schendel (2013)
 Top 15: Leona Natalia Fengler (1926), Amanda Beers (2003), Danamarie McNicholl (2019)
 Top 16: Karlyne Abele (1951)
 Top 18: Gladine Sweetser (1933)

Awards

Preliminary awards
 Preliminary Lifestyle and Fitness: Sharon Vaughn (1960), Susan Buckner (1972), Leslie Mays (1974), Kristine Weitz (1982), Mandy Schendel (2013)
 Preliminary Talent: Doris Hayes (1981) (tie)

Non-finalist awards
 Non-finalist Interview: Fianna Dickson (2004)
 Non-finalist Talent: Mardi Hagen (1964), Kippy Lou Brinkman (1966), Kristine Weitz (1982), Brittney Henry (2012)

Other awards
 Miss Congeniality: N/A
 Dr. David B. Allman Medical Scholarship: Honey Castro (1986)
 Miss America Scholar: Mariana Loya (1999)
 Quality of Life Award Finalists: Mandy Schendel (2013)
 STEM Scholarship Award Winners: Lizzi Jackson (2016)

Winners

References

External links
 Miss Washington official website

Miss America state pageants
Washington (state) culture
People from Washington (state)
Women in Washington (state)
1926 establishments in Washington (state)
Annual events in Washington (state)
Recurring events established in 1926